This is a list of all the yachts built by Lürssen, sorted by year.

Sailing yachts

Motor yachts

1954–1990

1991–2005

2006–2015

2016–present

Planned/Under construction

See also
 List of motor yachts by length
 Luxury yacht
 Lürssen

References

Lürssen
Built by Lürssen
Built by Lürssen
Lürssen